Samson were an English heavy metal band from London. Formed in summer 1977, the group originally featured vocalist and guitarist Paul Samson, bassist Chris Aylmer and drummer Clive Burr. The group were active until the eponymous frontman's death in 2002, at which point their lineup included lead vocalist Nicky Moore, bassist Ian Ellis and drummer Billy Fleming.

History

1977–1985
Samson were formed by Paul Samson, Chris Aylmer and Clive Burr in the summer of 1977. In March 1978, the group briefly experimented with a four-piece lineup featuring Stewart Cochrane on bass and Aylmer on rhythm guitar, however this was abandoned after one performance. The band released their first single "Telephone" in September, before Mark Newman briefly took over on lead vocals for a run of shows. Burr was replaced by Barry "Thunderstick" Purkis in early 1979, after which the group recorded their first album Survivors with Samson's former bandmate John McCoy producing.

Shortly after the release of Survivors, Samson brought in Bruce Dickinson as their new frontman, who took on the stage name "Bruce Bruce". Head On and Shock Tactics followed over the next two years, before Purkis left to form his own band Thunderstick in July 1981. He was replaced by Mel Gaynor in time for Reading Festival the following month, which proved to be Dickinson's final show with Samson when he accepted an offer to join Iron Maiden in September. He was soon replaced by Nicky Moore. Gaynor stepped back from the band in January 1982 and Pete Jupp took his place.

The lineup of Moore, Samson, Aylmer and Jupp released Before the Storm and Don't Get Mad, Get Even, before Aylmer was replaced by Merv Goldsworthy and Dave "Bucket" Colwell joined on rhythm guitar in 1984. In 1985, the group disbanded and released a final live album called Thank You and Goodnight, with Samson and Colwell later forming Paul Sampson's Empire.

1987–2002
In 1987, Samson reformed his eponymous band with Empire vocalist Mick White, adding bassist Dave Boyce, drummer Charlie Mack and keyboardist Toby Sadler. The group released the EP And There It Is... the following year, before White was replaced by Peter Scallan in February 1989. A new album called Look to the Future was recorded later in the year, but after being rejected by a number of record labels was remixed with new bass and extra guitar parts from Samson; the result, Refugee, was released the following year, before Samson was injured and the group became inactive.

After two years performing under the moniker Paul Samson's Rogues, the eponymous frontman formed a new lineup of Samson in the spring of 1992 with vocalist Rik Anthony, drummer Tony Tuohy and returning bassist Chris Aylmer. After Anthony left, the group continued to tour and released Samson in 1993. Tuohy left in early 1994 and the band broke up again.

In the summer of 1999, Samson reunited with Aylmer and Thunderstick for a series of anniversary shows; the reunion was originally slated to include vocalist Bruce Dickinson, however he ultimately rejoined Iron Maiden and Samson remained a trio. In 2000, Nicky Moore returned as the band's frontman for a series of shows. The following year, Samson and Moore began work on a new studio album tentatively titled Brand New Day, adding new members Ian Ellis on bass and Billy Fleming on drums. However, before the album could be finished, Paul Samson died of cancer on 9 August 2002.

Producer John McCoy continued to work on the recordings after Samson's death, releasing them as P.S. in 2006.

Members

Timeline

Lineups

References

Footnotes

External links
Paul Samson official website

Samson